The Hero Honda Splendor is an entry level motorcycle manufactured in India by Hero Honda. After Separation of Joint venture of Hero Honda, Now it is manufactured by Hero MotoCorp . It has an electronic ignition and a tubular double cradle type frame with a  engine. , Splendor models were selling at a rate of one million units per year.

History 
Splendor was launched  as a successor to the Hero Honda CD100 and the Hero Honda Sleek, both inspired by the Honda CB250RS series of the 1980s.
In 2004, Hero Honda launched the upgraded version of the Splendor, the Splendor+. This version features multi-reflector headlight, tail light and turn signal lights, and new graphics. In 2007, Hero Honda launched the Splendor plus with changes in body fairings and including alloy wheels and other improvements. Also in 2007 Hero Honda Launched Splendor NXG as it resembles "Next generation", but it hampered in terms of sales, So it eventually discontinued Splendor NXG in 2015. In 2009, Hero Honda launched 1 Crore edition in Splendor with updated graphics all black Paint in engine, black alloy wheel etc. In 2011, Hero Honda launched the Splendor Pro with changes in body fairings, self-start features, alloy wheels and other improvements with APDV = Advance Pro-Series Digital Variable Ignition System. In 2011 when Hero Honda was rebranded as Hero Motocorp, Hero badge replaced the Hero Honda in future models. In 2014, Hero Motocorp launched a new model 'Splendor iSmart', Which resembles the body panels, chassis and headlight setup of Splendor NXG., In 2022 Hero launched a new model Splendor+ Xtec that features digital speedometer, LED DRL strip on the headlight, Black alloy wheels with usb charging port with an i3s fuel saving technology.

After the separation of Hero group and Honda motor company, the Splendor is now manufactured by Hero Motocorp

Models
The first generation Splendor bike was launched in 1994 as the successor to the CD 100. A version with power start and a new engine began selling in 2011. The Splendor was the top-selling motorcycle in October 2016 with over 250,000 motorcycles. The Honda Activa replaced the Splendor as the best selling two-wheeler in October 2017. In February 2020 Hero launched the bs6 variant of Splendor+ with a catalytic converter to comply with new emission norms and with new graphics and colour options.

Models List from 1994 - Present

All Splendor Models equipped with same Engine and other Specification except Splendor NXG, Splendor i3s and Splendor iSmart 110 and updated Splendor plus i3s, Splendor classic, Xtec models updated with more power from 7.7 Horsepower to 8.02 Horsepower  with same engine configuration.

Hero Honda Splendor 1994  (1st Generation) (BS1) Bharat stage emission standards. (1994 - 2004).
Hero Honda Splendor Plus 2004 (BS2) and (BS3) Bharat stage emission standards (2nd Generation) and updated with Alloy Wheels instead of Spoke wheel in 2007.(2004 - 2011).
Hero Honda Splendor 1 Crore Special edition (BS3) Bharat stage emission standards with new updated all black paint in body, engine and alloy wheel(2009 - 2010).
Hero Honda Splendor NXG (Next Generation) (BS3) Bharat stage emission standards, This model came with Self Start, Alloy Wheels, New Premium Analogue Instrument Cluster with Trip meter and Completely new body design with same 97.2cc engine. (2007 - 2015).
Hero Honda Splendor Pro (3rd Generation) (BS3) Bharat stage emission standards, This model came with Self Start, Alloy Wheels and New Premium Analogue Instrument Cluster. (2011 - 2012)

After 2011, The separation of joint venture Hero Honda, Hero Motocorp replaced the Hero Honda logo with Hero Motocorp logo in their future models at that time.

Hero Splendor Pro (3rd Generation) (BS3) Bharat stage emission standards, Same Hero Honda Splendor Pro Model, name is rebadged (2011 - 2015).
Hero Splendor Plus (3rd Generation)(BS3) Bharat stage emission standards, Same Hero Honda Splendor Plus Model, name is rebadged (2011 - 2017).
Hero Splendor Classic (1st Generation) (BS3) Bharat stage emission standards, This motorcycle is styled to a cafe racer, the Splendor Pro Classic gets several classic styling cues like a new handle bar, which has been designed to resemble clip-ons, a round headlamp and tail lamp. The fuel tank, rear cowl and the single seat have also been moulded to make the Splendor Pro Classic look like a traditional cafe racer. The rear-view mirrors, headlamp ring, instrument cluster rings, front and rear fenders, suspension and the silencer have been finished in chrome to add its retro appeal, But it discontinued due to low sales in 2018.(2014 - 2018)
Hero Splendor ISmart (1st Generation) (BS3) Bharat stage emission standards, it is just an updated model of Hero Honda Splendor NXG with same engine, Features, design, chassis and added i3s(Idle Start Stop System) etc with rebadging of Hero Motocorp (2014 - 2016).
Hero Splendor Pro (4th Generation) (BS3) Bharat stage emission standards, New edition of Splendor Pro with New design Instrument cluster, Tank, and body design, self start with same 97.2cc power plant (2015-2018).
Hero Splendor Plus i3s (4th Generation) (BS4) Bharat stage emission standards, This model gets Idle start stop system, new color schemes and graphics with same old school Splendor Plus design and engine. Later, it get updated with IBS (Integrated Braking system), catalytic converter, Oxygen sensor on exhaust with Programmed fuel injection system to comply with (BS6) emission NormsBharat stage emission standards in 2020. (2018–Present)
Hero Splendor ISMART 110 (2nd Generation) (BS6) Bharat stage emission standards Successor of Splendor ISmart(1st Generation), This Model also get Idle start stop system, with completely new design and brand new 110cc Power plant, and also it is the first bike in India to get BS6 emission NormsBharat stage emission standards Complaint in 2019 with added  catalytic converter, Oxygen sensor on exhaust with Programmed fuel injection, but it eventually discontinued in 2021 due to low sales (2017-2021).
Hero Honda Splendor Plus XTEC (5th Generation) (BS6) Bharat stage emission standards Launched in 2022, with updated all black graphics, all-digital instrument cluster with Bluetooth connectivity and it offers a host of information, including SMS & call alerts, twin trip meters, Led DRL in Front Visor and a real-time mileage indicator. (2022–Present).

References

4. 

5. 

6. 

7. 

8. 

9. .

10. .

11. .

12. .

13. .

14. .

15. .

16. .

17. .

18. .

19. .

20.  .

21. .

22. .

Splendor
Motorcycles introduced in 1994